Masiniyeh-ye Sofla (also Romanized as Masīnīyeh-ye Soflá and Moseynīyeh-ye Soflá; also known as Masīnīyeh, Mohs̄enīyeh, and Moseynīyeh) is a village in Abdoliyeh-ye Gharbi Rural District, in the Central District of Ramshir County, Khuzestan Province, Iran. At the 2006 census, its population was 120, in 14 families.

References 

Populated places in Ramshir County